Neophytus or Neophytos ("newly-planted, newcomer") may refer to:

 Neophytos of Nicaea, a Christian martyr
 Neophytus (freedman), an imperial freedman of emperor Nero
 Patriarch Neophytus I of Constantinople, Patriarch of Constantinople in 1153
 Patriarch Neophytus II of Constantinople, Patriarch of Constantinople in 1602–03 and 1607–12
 Patriarch Neophytus III of Constantinople, Patriarch of Constantinople in 1636–37
 Patriarch Neophytus IV of Constantinople, Patriarch of Constantinople in 1688
 Patriarch Neophytus V of Constantinople, Patriarch of Constantinople in 1707
 Patriarch Neophytus VI of Constantinople, Patriarch of Constantinople in 1734–40 and 1743–44
 Patriarch Neophytus VII of Constantinople, Patriarch of Constantinople in 1789–94 and 1798–1801
 Patriarch Neophytus VIII of Constantinople, Patriarch of Constantinople in 1891–94
 Neophytos of Cyprus (1134–1214), Cypriot monk and historian
 Neophytos Nasri (1670–1731), Melkite bishop
 Neophytos of Chios (died 1686), Orthodox Patriarch of Antioch in 1673–82
 Neophytos Doukas (1760–1845), Greek cleric and scholar
 Neophytos Vamvas (1770–1856), Greek cleric and educator
 Neophytos Larkou (born 1966), Cypriot football player

See also 
 Neophyte
 Neofit